Meineckia nguruensis is a species of plant in the family Phyllanthaceae. It is endemic to Tanzania.

References

Flora of Tanzania
nguruensis
Vulnerable plants
Taxonomy articles created by Polbot